Franz Zilly was a German figure skater who competed in men's singles.

He won the bronze medal at the first-ever European Figure Skating Championship (held in Hamburg in 1891).

Competitive highlights

References 

 

German male single skaters
Date of birth missing
Date of death missing